Kuros may refer to:
 Kuros, Iran or Hoseynabad-e Koru, a village in Semnan Province, Iran
 Kuros (company), an online sportwear retailer 
 Kuros, a character in Wizards & Warriors
 Kuros, a PC game by Sandlot Games

People with the surname
 Kevin Kuros (fl. 2010s), American state legislator who served in the Massachusetts House of Representatives

See also
 Kuro (disambiguation)